Prayer for the Day is a religious radio programme broadcast on BBC Radio 4 in the United Kingdom.  It comprises a  2-minute reading or prayer and reflection to start the day.

Transmission
In 1983 the programme, which had always gone on air at 6.50am, was moved to 6.25am and replaced by a "Business News" slot. Since 1998 it has been broadcast each day between 5.43 and 5.45. a.m. before ''Farming Today.

Contributors
Recent contributors have included George Pitcher, Shaunaka Rishi Das, George Craig, Rabbi Dr Naftali Brawer, Judy Merry,
Canon Stephen Shipley and Canon Noel Battye.

References

External links
 BBC Radio 4 website

BBC Radio 4 programmes
British religious radio programmes